Syracuse basketball can refer to:

Syracuse Orange men's basketball
Syracuse Orange women's basketball